Ralph Waldo Emerson (1803–1882) was an American philosopher and essayist.

Ralph Emerson may also refer to:

Ralph Emerson (theologian) (1787–1863), American Congregational pastor in Norfolk, Connecticut
Ralph Emerson (botanist) (1912–1979), American botanist, academic, and professor at the University of California, Berkeley
William Ralph Emerson (1833–1917), American architect
 Ralph Emerson (1899–1984), American actor
Ralph Waldo Emerson Jones (1905–1982), American educator and baseball coach

See also
Emerson (surname)